Jayraj Salgaokar (born 3 June 1954) is a writer, co-founder, publisher and the managing director of Kalnirnay.

Current activities
 Co-Founder, Publisher & Managing Director of Kalnirnay, India’s Largest Selling multilingual publication. Combined global sales of Kalnirnay are well over 12 million (The Marathi & Hindi editions sales certified by Audit Bureau of Circulation).
 Editor of “Kalnirnay Sanskrutik, an upmarket Diwali (Festive) publication in Marathi.
 Launched the first ever Indian web-site Kalnirnay.com (NIC No 42) in 1996.
 Working on the mobile-telephony content management of cultural relevance, with most of the mobile operators.
 Launched Kalnirnay on iPad, iPhone & Android.
 Filed a patent for OREN-horn usage meter to prevent sound pollution in cities.
 Patented anti-copying special ink to prevent print piracy.

Publications
 Published the first book ‘SamaVyasta’ in 1976 by innovative offset technique that was entirely new then, but is now used rampantly for budget publications. Writing regular articles in Loksatta, Maharashtra Times and a column ‘Blowing in the wind’ in daily newspaper DivyaMarathi. Written articles about agriculture, co-operative agro-marketing. Visiting lecturer on Newspaper printing technology and Internet in various colleges.
 Published the second book ‘Kashasathi Kuthvar’of column articles written for Lokmat, the largest selling Marathi daily.
 Published a book “Jag Pravaha” (Mauj Prakashan) on global trends & economics.
 Recent books: Recently published AjinkyaYoddha Bajirao [History] (Param Mitra Publishing), Paisa Aani Madhyamvarga [Economics] (Majestic Publishing). This book won the C.D.Deshmukh Award of Maharashtra State Govt. for the best book on economics(2012–13).
 A member of Advisory Committee of “Pradnya Pathshala”, Wai, a Government of Maharashtra Organisation working on education.
 Neo-Gutenberg (A New Project, is a tribute to great Gutenberg through the contemporary lens). The book aims to provide the history of mechanized communication and the forthcoming New Renaissance in offing, due to Information Technology.

Professional association
 Worked as Member on the Board of Directors of Indian Institution of Forest Management, Govt. of India, Bhopal 1998-2001.
 Worked closely with Dabhol Power Company (Enron) on Government, Media, Social, local and community issues for three years.
 Also worked on the Managing Committee of “Granthalee” a readers co-operative publishing movement.
 Undertaken some innovative socially oriented publishing projects.
 Worked with Maharashtra Krishna Valley Development Corporation as a Financial Adviser for the mega-irrigation projects, local issues Media and the State Government for three years.
 Member of the organizing committee of Asian film festival ‘The Third Eye’.
 Worked on Bombay Master Printers Association as managing committee member in 1997 – 2000 and as a secretary in 2000-2001.
 Planning Commission (Govt. of India) worked on Committee on Labour and Employment (2009-2011).
 Currently working for the Jaitapur Nuclear Power Project of Nuclear Power Corporation of India, on press relations, community relations with the Chief Minister’s Office.

Hobbies
 Mountaineering, done a basic course at Himalayan Mountaineering Institute, Darjeeling, and a few treks and two expeditions in the Himalayan range. Was a member of the successful “Tata Everest Indian 98” expedition to Mount Everest, the first successful attempt on the world’s highest mountain from the north-Tibet-face.
 
 Founder member of R.Ruia College’s Amateur Movie Club “Ruia Film Society”.

References

1954 births
Living people
Writers from Mumbai
Businesspeople from Mumbai